Hungarian Rhapsody No. 11, S.244/11, in A minor, is the eleventh Hungarian Rhapsody by Franz Liszt. An average performance of the piece lasts about five minutes.

Sources of the melodies 
This rhapsody is based on a verbunkos and two csárdás.

References

External links 
 

11
1847 compositions
Articles containing video clips

Compositions in A minor